Vinny McCarthy (born 27 September 1955 ) is a Scottish former soccer player.

Having had a spell at Partick Thistle in Scotland, McCarthy was signed by Manchester United although injury restricted his opportunities at Old Trafford. After a short stay in Manchester, McCarthy was signed by Waterford United on the same day as Bobby Charlton. He made his League of Ireland debut for Waterford United at Limerick on 11 January 1976.

McCarthy signed for Shamrock Rovers in July 1987.

He made a scoring debut in a League Cup game in Longford on 23 August.

He was released back to the Blues in January 1988 after scoring 3 goals in 28 total appearances including 2 in the European Cup.

McCarthy represented the League of Ireland at Inter-League level.

Honours
FAI Cup: 1
 Waterford United 1980
League of Ireland First Division: 1
 Waterford United 1989/90

References

Living people
Footballers from Glasgow
Scottish footballers
Shamrock Rovers F.C. players
Waterford F.C. players
Cobh Ramblers F.C. players
League of Ireland players
League of Ireland XI players
1958 births
Expatriate association footballers in the Republic of Ireland
Scottish expatriate footballers
Scottish expatriate sportspeople in the United States
Expatriate soccer players in the United States
Association football midfielders
Scottish expatriate sportspeople in Ireland
American Soccer League (1933–1983) players
Utah Golden Spikers players
Los Angeles Skyhawks players